The Logan Express is an airport bus shuttle which operates between Boston Logan International Airport and Massachusetts suburbs. The service, which is funded by Massport, consists of five routes that run between all of Logan Airport's terminals and the towns of Braintree, Framingham, Peabody, Woburn, and the Boston neighborhood of Back Bay. Each route runs direct between the airport and its suburban terminus on a set schedule.

The Logan Express operates using motorcoach-style buses on most of its routes, except for Back Bay, which uses Massport owned airport shuttle buses. Passengers traveling to Logan Airport on the service are dropped off at each terminal's departures level, while passengers taking the service from the airport are picked up on the arrivals level at designated curbs. Buses make onboard announcements detailing which terminal stop passengers should disembark at, depending on which airline they are flying.

Massport considers the Logan Express to be a part of its strategy to reduce traffic congestion at the airport, improving passenger experience and reducing the environmental impact of traveling to the airport. Riders are encouraged to park at lots located at each of the suburban terminals (except for Back Bay).

Routes
In addition to their suburban terminus, all Logan Express routes make five stops at Logan Airport: Terminal A, two stops at Terminal B, Terminal C, and Terminal E. On outbound trips, buses depart Terminal A at the time listed on their schedule, with departures from the following terminals occurring sequentially after.

Back Bay

Buses to Back Bay are operated by Massport and make two stops in the neighborhood, at Hynes Convention Center and the MBTA's Back Bay station. Buses departing Logan Airport are free for passengers, while trips to the airport are $3.00. This service runs daily every 20 minutes, starting at the top of the hour, from 5:00 am to 10:00 pm. Travel time is approximately 20 minutes. Back Bay buses wear a standard Massport bus livery but are highlighted with orange accents and have additional Logan Express titles.

Braintree
Buses to Braintree are operated by Paul Revere Bus Company and stop at a dedicated terminal opposite the South Shore Plaza. Like the Back Bay route, buses depart every 20 minutes starting at the top of the hour, beginning as early as 2:00 am on weekdays and as late at 1:15 am daily. Travel time is typically between 30 and 45 minutes. Braintree buses are painted in a blue Logan Express livery. The Braintree route is the system's busiest, with over 740,000 annual riders.

Framingham
Buses to Framingham are operated by Fox Bus Company and stop at a dedicated terminal on Burr Street. Buses depart the terminal and the airport every half hour on the half hour from 4:00 am to midnight, with additional trips as early as 2:15 am, and travel times range from 30 to 45 minutes. Framingham buses are painted in a red Logan Express livery. The Framingham route has over 580,000 annual riders.

Peabody
Buses to Peabody are operated by McGinn Bus Company and stop on Newbury Street at a dedicated lot. Travel time is 30 to 45 minutes and buses operate every hour between 3:15 am and 1:15 am, departing at quarter past the hour. Peabody buses are painted in a purple Logan Express livery.

Woburn

Buses to Woburn are also operated by Paul Revere  Bus Company and stop at the Anderson Regional Transportation Center in Woburn. Here, passengers can connect to the MBTA Commuter Rail or Amtrak's Downeaster. Travel time is 30 to 45 minutes and buses operate every half hour on the half hour between 4:00 am and midnight, with additional early and late trips on a less frequent schedule. Woburn buses are painted in a green Logan Express livery.

Fares
One way fares for riding the Logan express range from free to $12.00. Parking at each of the termini is $7.00 per day. Some routes offer additional incentives, such as complimentary expedited TSA security screening at the airport. Buses from Back Bay do not accept cash and fares must be paid by credit or debit on board. For all other routes, tickets can be purchased with cash or credit either in the terminal (for travel to the airport) or onboard upon arrival (for travel from the airport).

Future plans
As Logan Express ridership increases, and traffic congestion at the airport worsens, Massport continues to consider adding new routes. Currently, a route to North Station is in the planning stages, primarily fueled by the success of the intra-city Back Bay route. Additionally, a new route to an undisclosed suburban location is expected within the next five years, along with online ticket reservations. Massport states that their future Logan Express improvement plans are expected to double ridership and will remove up to three million vehicle trips from the roads in and around Logan Airport.

References

External links
 Logan Express Site

Logan International Airport
Bus transportation in Massachusetts
Bus transportation in the Boston area
Transportation in Braintree, Massachusetts
Airport bus services